Strange Music is an album by Anton LaVey released in 1994 through Amarillo Records.

Track listing

References

1994 albums
Culture of San Francisco
Amarillo Records albums
Works by Anton LaVey